Neuwilen is a village and former municipality in the canton of Thurgau, Switzerland.

The municipality also contained the village Schwaderloh.

In 1996 the municipality was merged with the other, neighboring municipalities Alterswilen, Altishausen, Dotnacht, Ellighausen, Hugelshofen, Lippoldswilen and Siegershausen to form a new and larger municipality Kemmental.

About 250 people live in Neuwilen.  The only public buildings are the primary school building and the kindergarten building.

Former municipalities of Thurgau
Villages in Switzerland